Trenton Guy (born August 22, 1987) is an American football slotback who is currently a free agent. He played college football at the University of Louisville and attended West Charlotte High School in Charlotte, North Carolina. He has been a member of the Oakland Raiders, Carolina Panthers, Montreal Alouettes and Toronto Argonauts.

Professional career

Oakland Raiders
Guy was signed by the Oakland Raiders on April 24, 2010, after going undrafted in the 2010 NFL Draft.

Carolina Panthers
Guy signed with the Carolina Panthers on April 30, 2010. He was released by the Panthers on September 4, and signed to the Panthers' practice squad on September 6, 2010. He was released by the Panthers on August 27, 2011.

Montreal Alouettes
Guy was signed by the Montreal Alouettes on January 27, 2012. He was released by the Alouettes on February 1, 2013.

Toronto Argonauts
Guy signed with the Toronto Argonauts on June 2, 2013. He was granted free agency at the end of the 2013 CFL season. He signed with the Argonauts on August 11, 2014. On September 30, 2014, Guy was released by the Argonauts.

References

External links
Just Sports Stats
College stats
NFL Draft Scout

Living people
1987 births
Players of American football from Charlotte, North Carolina
American football wide receivers
Canadian football slotbacks
Canadian football wide receivers
African-American players of American football
African-American players of Canadian football
Louisville Cardinals football players
Montreal Alouettes players
Toronto Argonauts players
Sportspeople from Charlotte, North Carolina
21st-century African-American sportspeople
20th-century African-American people